The Descent from the Cross is a 1633 painting of the Descent from the Cross by Rembrandt. It is now in the Alte Pinakothek in Munich. It is a companion piece to Rembrandt's later The Raising of the Cross.

References

Sources
https://web.archive.org/web/20120217191016/http://www.pinakothek.de/rembrandt-harmensz-van-rijn/kreuzabnahme-christi

1633 paintings
Paintings by Rembrandt
Collection of the Alte Pinakothek
Rembrandt, 1633